Bifunctional heparan sulfate N-deacetylase/N-sulfotransferase 2 is an enzyme that in humans is encoded by the NDST2 gene.

References

Further reading

Human proteins